Bruno Mattei (30 July 1931 – 21 May 2007) was an Italian film director, screenwriter, and editor who directed  exploitation films in many genres, including women in prison, nunsploitation, zombie, mondo, cannibal, and Nazisploitation films. Mattei's films often followed popular genre trends of the era. Mattei continued work as a director primarily in the Philippines until his death in 2007, just before he was to enter production on his fifth Zombie film.

Biography 
Bruno Mattei was born on 30 July 1931 in Rome, Italy. Mattei grew up around films as his father owned a film editing studio. He studied at the Centro Sperimentale Centrale, the national film school, and graduated in 1951. Mattei initially worked as a screenwriter and claimed to have worked on over 100 films as an editor, a claim that film historian Louis Paul stated was "difficult to verify". Some of the earliest films Mattei worked on included Lulu and Tua per la vita. Early film work started in 1956 on Giovanni dalle Bande Nere, after which Mattei worked on several peplum and Eurospy films.

His first film as a director was Armida, il Dramma di Una Sposa (1970), after which he directed Cuginetta...Amore Mio!, an exploitation film starring Rita De Simone. Then followed his Nazi-themed exploitation films such as SS Girls and KZ9 Lager di Sterminio, some mondo documentary films starring Laura Gemser, Le Notti Porno nel Mondo and Emanuelle le Porno Notti del Mondo N. 2,  and nunsploitation films such as The True Story of the Nun of Monza and The Other Hell.

Mattei continued working in various other exploitation-themed genres in the 1980s such as zombie films, sex films, peplums, and Vietnam War-themed productions.  In 1982, Mattei filmed two "women in prison" films, Women's Prison Massacre  and Violence in a Women's Prison. The liner notes for the Women's Prison Massacre DVD release state "Mattei, using the moniker Gilbert Roussel, shot Women's Prison Massacre back-to-back with his Violence in a Women's Prison. It has basically the same cast, but both films are completely different."

In 1980, Mattei began collaborating with screenwriter Claudio Fragasso, beginning with The True Story of the Nun of Monza (1980) and ending with a comedy called Three For One (1990). The two worked closely together for that ten-year period (collaborating on 15 films), with Fragasso occasionally assuming the role of second unit director.

Mattei was initially attached to direct an adaptation of Hercules from a screenplay by Ricardo Ghione. Principal photography was scheduled to begin May 1982 in Rome, Italy while The Hollywood Reporter naming Fragasso as screenwriter, and Ennio Morricone as music composer and conductor. Neither Mattei, Fragasso, or Morricone appear in onscreen credits. The Hollywood Reporter later stated that principal photography on Hercules began in August 1982 in Italy under the direction of Luigi Cozzi. Mattei later directed Lou Ferrigno in The Seven Magnificent Gladiators.)

Mattei replaced Lucio Fulci as the director of Zombi 3 in the Philippines, after Fulci left the project unfinished, then co-produced Zombie 4: After Death immediately afterward with Fragasso in the director's chair, using the same sets and some of the same cast members. Mattei's other late-1980s films included Robowar and Shocking Dark - Terminator II (which incorporated elements of other popular science fiction films of the time such as The Terminator and Alien). As the 1980s ended, most of Mattei's work was released direct to video or to Italian television such as his Appuntamento a Trieste, a 1987 6-hour-long Italian TV mini-series. Many of Mattei's films from the 1990s became harder to find as export releases or home video releases.

From 1993 onward, Mattei worked as a director almost exclusively for Italian producer Giovanni Paolucci, a working arrangement that jump-started Mattei's career after he and Fragasso had gone their own ways in 1990. Paolucci produced most of Mattei's later films, beginning with Dangerous Attraction and ending with Mattei's final film, Zombies: The Beginning. Mattei continued directing films right up until his death. Mattei died in Rome, Italy in a hospital after complications from brain tumor surgery on May 21, 2007, at age 75.

Style
Jason Buchanan described Bruno Mattei's films as "low budget, gore-drenched efforts" and that "B-movie lovers can argue his importance in the realm of film until the world ends, few will deny that his films rarely fail to entertain on terms of sleaze and gratuitous violence alone -- if that's your kind of thing."

Louis Paul, in his analysis of Italian horror film directors, stated that Mattei's career consisted of him being a "director of copy-cat movies. Whenever a film or a genre became popular, he directed his own (unsanctioned) remake or unofficial sequel." Daniel Budnik, an author of a book on 1980s action films, described Mattei as "no stranger to simply ripping stuff off", noting his use of Goblin's music for Hell of the Living Dead, stock footage from documentaries on South African tribes, and shark attack footage for his Cruel Jaws, ultimately describing him as "the best of all possible rip-off artists [...] Bruno just really did his own thing and went his own way" which involved "ripping everyone off, but you can't have everything".

Mattei used several aliases through his career, including Jordan B. Matthews, Jimmy Matheus, Gilbert Roussel, Axel Berger, Michael Cardoso, David Hunt, Werner Knox, Pierre Le Blanc, Stefan Oblowsky and most famously Vincent Dawn.

Selected filmography
Note: The films listed as N/A are not necessarily chronological.

References

Bibliography

External links 
 
 

1931 births
2007 deaths
Film directors from Rome
Horror film directors